Kingenta Ecological Engineering Co. Ltd is a Chinese enterprise devoted to research and development, production and marketing of compound fertilizers (CF), slow/controlled-release fertilizers (SCRF), water-soluble fertilizer (WSF) and other specialty fertilizers. It has the world’s largest production base of SCRF with RMB 8.7 billion of total assets, more than 10,000 staff and 6 million tons of production capacity. In 2010, the Company was officially listed in the Shenzhen Stock Exchange. In 2013, sales reached RMB 11.992 billion. In March 2018, Kingenta launched a public welfare campaign in Beijing.

National projects 
Kingenta was in charge of more than 30 national and provincial major scientific projects, including the “11th Five-Year” and “12th Five-Year” National Science-technology Support Plan Projects, the National Spark Plan, and the National Key New Product Plan.

Recognition 
As of 2014, it had 159 patents. It had won 2 second prizes of National Scientific and Technological Progress Award, 2 first prizes of Shandong Scientific and Technological Progress Awards, 3 National New Key Products, and 2 Key National Brands.

Research and development 
Kingenta established long-term cooperative relations with more than 40 research institutions such as Shandong Agricultural University, China Agricultural University, and the National Agro-Tech Extension and Service Center. It has good cooperation with the University of Florida, six American universities, and three USDA experimental stations, which formed an integrated system of upstream and downstream, production-education-research at home and abroad.

Kingenta’s R&D center 
 National SCRF R&D Center
 National NPK Engineering Research Centre
 National Experiment Lab for Highly Efficient Usage Soil and Fertilizer
  Postdoctoral workstation
 The Ministry of Agriculture Plant Nutrition and Fertilizer Experimental Lab
 Shandong Province Academician Workstation

References

External links 
 Official Webpage

Chinese companies established in 1998
Manufacturing companies based in Shenzhen